Jacques Goimard (May 31, 1934 – October 25, 2012) was a French writer of science fiction and fantasy anthologies.  He is also an essayist.

Biography
He was born in 1934 in La Couronne, France.

He taught at Henri-IV, a secondary school, before teaching history and cinema as well as running a literary seminar at the University of Paris I and the University of Paris VII.

He has written several anthologies, essays, and novels.  He has also written several movie reviews, and has written in the magazines Fiction and Métal Hurlant and in the newspaper Le Monde.

References

French science fiction writers
1934 births
2012 deaths
French male novelists
20th-century French novelists
20th-century French male writers